Greater Brunswick Charter School (GBCS) is a free, public charter school serving grades kindergarten through eighth located on 429 Joyce Kilmer Avenue in New Brunswick, New Jersey. The school has a Spanish-English bilingual program for grades K-4, and has plans to extend it through grade five.

History
The school opened in the 1998–99 school year. In 2004, it purchased its current building, formerly a bowling alley, with the help of a $500,000 government grant and a $2.5 million loan from New Jersey Community Capital and the Community Redevelopment Fund.

Over the summer of 2010, the charter school expanded, creating over a dozen classrooms and a larger gymnasium out of warehouse space in the building. The funding for this was secured by the nonprofit organization Build With Purpose (then known as READS). A year prior to this expansion, the school's middle school and one fifth grade classroom had been housed across the street from the school building. The following year, a playground was added, with assistance from KaBOOM!.

Student body
As of the 2017–18 school year, the school had an enrollment of 395 students and 33.0 classroom teachers (on an FTE basis), for a student–teacher ratio of 12.0:1. 70.4% were Hispanic, 19.4% were black, 8.1% were white, and 1.8% were Asian. 63.4% of the students were eligible for a free or reduced-price lunch. 55.2% of students primarily spoke Spanish and 44.8% primarily spoke English at home. The school has a student:teacher ratio of 15:1. GBCS will accept students from any district in New Jersey, although it gives preference to those from Edison, New Brunswick, and Highland Park.

Administration
Core members of the school administration include Vanessa Jones, the education director; and Hector Alvarez, the assistant education director.

References

Buildings and structures in New Brunswick, New Jersey
Charter schools in New Jersey
Educational institutions established in 1998
1998 establishments in New Jersey